= Autovía A-394 =

Highway in Andalusia, Spain

The Autovía A-394 is a highway in Spain. It passes through Andalusia.
